James Ray Hart (October 30, 1941 – May 19, 2016) was an American baseball player who was a third baseman in Major League Baseball. He played for the National League's San Francisco Giants from 1963 to 1973 and the American League's New York Yankees in 1973 and 1974. Hart batted and threw right-handed. In a 12-season career, Hart posted a .278 batting average, with 170 home runs and 578 runs batted in (RBIs) in 1,125 Major League games played.

Career
In 1965, Hart was fined and suspended by Giants' manager Herman Franks after breaking curfew. Some of his teammates feared he was becoming an alcoholic, and Giants' captain Willie Mays had a talk with him. Mays told him, "If you play for me for six days, I'll give you one day," meaning if Hart was ready to play during the week, Mays would give him a bottle of Old Crow each Monday. "He was ready to play every day," Mays reported, and he gave Hart five hundred dollars out of his own pocket after the season for always being ready.

Hart had some notable achievements in baseball, including: tying for second with Rico Carty in NL Rookie of the Year award voting in 1964 (they both finished behind Dick Allen); playing in the All-Star game for the National League in 1966; being named NL Player of the Month in July 1967 (.355, 13 HR, 30 RBI); and hitting for the cycle on July 8, 1970. That same day, he also became one of a select few players to have six RBIs in one inning. He did this by hitting a three-run triple and a three-run home run in the fifth inning of a game against the Atlanta Braves.

However, Hart had a reputation as a poor defensive player at third base. He finished second, first and second among National League third basemen in errors in his first three full seasons in the majors (1964–66), never playing as many as 90 games at third in a season after that. In The New Bill James Historical Baseball Abstract, Bill James ranks Hart as the 74th-best third baseman of all time, writing about him, "A better hitter than 59 of the 73 men listed ahead of him at third base. This should tell you all you need to know about his defense."

Following his release from the major leagues in 1974, Hart played in Mexico before retiring from baseball in 1976.

Later life
Hart joined the Teamsters as a warehouseman for Safeway supermarkets in Richmond, California, and later to Tracy, California, when operations moved there in 1992; he retired from Safeway in 2006.

Hart died on May 19, 2016.

See also
 List of Major League Baseball players to hit for the cycle

References

Further reading

External links
, or Retrosheet

1941 births
2016 deaths
African-American baseball players
Baseball players from North Carolina
Fresno Giants players
Major League Baseball left fielders
Major League Baseball third basemen
National League All-Stars
New York Yankees players
Phoenix Giants players
People from Greene County, North Carolina
Quincy Giants players
Rieleros de Aguascalientes players
Rojos del Águila de Veracruz players
Salem Rebels players
San Francisco Giants players
Springfield Giants players
Syracuse Chiefs players
Tacoma Giants players
20th-century African-American sportspeople
21st-century African-American people